The Andre Felix National Park is a national park found in Central African Republic, contiguous to Radom National Park in Sudan. It was established in 1960 and its area is 951 km.

Park consists of a lowland, a fairly open forest in the northern half, with a densely forested, elevated southern sector.

It is home to a jungle forest savannah with Bambusa, Isoberlinia and Terminalia.

The main species of fauna found are ostriches, buffaloes, crocodiles, elephants, giraffes, hippos, lions, panthers, wild boars among others.

external Links
Birdlife.org

References

National parks of the Central African Republic
Haute-Kotto